Evgraf Fedorovich Krendovsky (Russian: Евграф Фёдорович Крендовский, 1810, Kremenchuk, Poltava Governorate, Russian Empire — 1870s, unknown) was a Russian portrait, genre and interior portrait painter.

Biography 
Little is known of his background. His father was apparently a constable of some sort so, as a young man, he worked at the police station in Arzamas, where he also attended the famous art school operated by Alexander Stupin. From 1830 to 1835, he lived in Saint Petersburg and studied with Alexey Venetsianov. At that time, he is known to have presented an exhibition at the Imperial Academy of Arts.

In 1835, family issues forced him to return to Kremenchuk, where he became the drawing tutor for a local landowner's family in nearby Poltava Province. Four years later, on the basis of two paintings sent to the Academy, he was awarded the title of "Free Artist". Despite being relatively isolated in the provinces, some of his best-known works were created during the 1840s, some of which are now in the Tretyakov Gallery.

Slightly more than twenty paintings constitute his entire known output. His last extant work is dated 1853, and he may have operated a private art school in the 1860s. His fate after that point is unknown, although it is generally believed that he lived at his brother's estate near Arzamas and died sometime during the 1870s.

Selected paintings

References

Further reading 
 М. N. Shumova. Русская живопись первой половины XIX века (Russian Painting of the First Half of the Nineteenth Century). Моscow, Искусство (1978) p. 92

External links 

1810 births
1870s deaths
Date of death unknown
Russian painters
Russian male painters
Genre painters
19th-century painters from the Russian Empire
People from Kremenchuk
19th-century male artists from the Russian Empire